Hohhot College of Police is a law enforcement education college in the Chinese city of Hohhot.

Education in Hohhot
Schools in China